Chengdu–Chongqing railway or Chengyu railway, is a single-track electrified railroad in the Sichuan Basin of Southwest China between the cities Chengdu and Chongqing. Chongqing's short form name is Yu (渝) and the railway is named after the two cities.

The Chengyu railway opened in 1952 and was the first railway to be built after the founding of the People's Republic of China.  Other cities along the route include Jianyang, Ziyang, Zizhong, Neijiang, Longchang and Yongchuan. The line is single-track, but duplication commenced between Chongqing and Jiangjin in November 2019.

History

In 1903, a railway line between Chengdu and Chongqing, the two biggest cities in Sichuan, was proposed by Huguang Viceroy Zhang Zhidong as part of a railway from Sichuan to Wuhan.  Construction on this line began in 1909 and halted in 1911.  Attempts to resume construction in 1936, by the China Development Finance Corporation, and in 1947 ended with the outbreak of the Sino-Japanese War and the Chinese Civil War.  On December 31, 1949, shortly after the Chinese Communists captured Sichuan from the Nationalists, Secretary of the Southwest Bureau Deng Xiaoping proposed the building of the railway.  Work began on June 15, 1950 and involved 30,000 People's Liberation Army troops and 10,000 civilian laborers.  More than 400 private steel mills in Chongqing supplied steel for the line.  The line was completed on June 13, 1952, and entered into trial operation on July 1. It was the first railway line built in China after the establishment of the People's Republic of China.

In 1987, the Chengyu Line was fully electrified, raising annual carrying capacity from 6.1 million tons to 13 million.

The opening of the Chengdu–Chongqing Expressway in 1995 drew passengers away from the railway.

By 2008, the line was transporting 90 million tons of cargo and 70 million passengers per year.

Passenger service 
As of 2021, the only remaining passenger service is a one train in each direction per day between Chongqing and Neijiang.

Other rail lines between Chengdu and Chongqing 
Since 2009, high-speed CRH passenger trains run on that route.

Although it follows a route generally similar to that of the original Chengdu–Chongqing railway, it is significantly shorter due to the greater use of elevated sections and tunnels.

Rail junctions
 Chengdu: Baoji–Chengdu railway, Chengdu–Kunming railway
 Neijiang: Neijiang–Kunming railway
 Chongqing: Xiangfan–Chongqing railway, Chongqing–Huaihua railway

See also

 List of railways in China

References

External links

Railway lines in China
Rail transport in Sichuan
Rail transport in Chongqing
Railway lines opened in 1952